Eric Lloyd Wright (born November 8, 1929) is an American architect, son of Frank Lloyd Wright Jr. and the grandson of the famed Frank Lloyd Wright.

Early life and education
Wright was born in Los Angeles on November 8, 1929, to Helen Taggart and Lloyd Wright (Frank Lloyd Wright Jr.). His father was a landscape architect and architect who was the eldest son of Frank Lloyd Wright Sr. Educated at the University of California, Los Angeles, Eric worked in his grandfather's (1948-1956) and father's (1956-1978) firm as an apprentice. He received his license as an architect in 1967, before establishing his own firm, Eric Lloyd Wright Architecture and Planning, in 1978. Eric lived in Topanga, California, before moving to his present residence above Malibu, on land that his father, Lloyd Wright, assembled. The land was cleared of brush by Rupert Pole (Eric's half brother), Anaïs Nin (Eric's sister-in-law), Eric, the office staff, Lloyd and Helen, and they often used it as a picnic spot before Lloyd died in 1978.

Career and philosophy in architecture

"Wright’s early education as his grandfather’s apprentice at Taliesin and Taliesin West from 1948 to 1956 allowed him to partake in iconic projects such as New York’s Guggenheim Museum and Monona Terrace in Madison, Wisconsin." He worked in his father's firm in Hollywood, California, until 1978 when his father died. Then he began his own firm of architects and planners.

Eric Lloyd Wright Architecture and Planning does design and building, and Wright also leads a nonprofit called Wright Organic Resource Center. The firm's focus is on residences, often working with other architecture firms for final construction. He has worked on larger projects, including the Sunset Community High School. He follows the concept put forth by his grandfather, termed Organic Architecture. "This “organic” concept not only predates the green-building trend of the past decade but also established the ideas that would come to be accepted as common sense concepts of smart design."

The nonprofit Center provides educational programs on the grounds, which also include his home and the offices of his firm. The 24-acre site was purchased by his father in 1956, but never developed. Wright inherited the land from his father, and he has developed it slowly over the years, first as an office, and beginning in 1984, as his home.

Most of Wright's work is in the United States. In 1995 he worked on housing in Japan, and in 1993 he helped established Chi-Am Group Incorporated and Chi-Am Consortium, two Chinese-American architectural firms.

Many of his personal and architectural records were burned in a 1993 fire at his home. He donated the papers and records of his father and grandfather to the University of California at Los Angeles prior to that, where they are safe from fires.

Personal life

He lives with his wife Mary, a watercolor artist. They met in 1960 in Los Angeles. They have two sons.

Restoring Frank Lloyd Wright buildings
Wright is responsible for a number of restoration projects to his grandfather's buildings:

 Storer Residence - Los Angeles, California
 Ennis Residence - Los Angeles, California
 Auldbrass Plantation - Yemassee, South Carolina
 Eric Lloyd Wright Boulder House - an adaptation of an original design by his grandfather in Malibu, California
 Greer Ranch - Murrietta, California
 Murrietta Oaks - Murrietta, California

Other projects
Other projects by Wright include:

 Walker Residence, Carmel, California
 Guggenheim Museum, New York, New York
 Gerald B. and Beverley Tonkens House, Cincinnati, Ohio
 Monona Terrace, Madison, Wisconsin
 Wayfarer’s Chapel, Rancho Palos Verdes, California
 First Christian Church, Thousand Oaks, California
 The Good Shepherd Church, Des Plaines, Illinois
 The Institute of Mental Physics Joshua Tree, California 
 Student & Faculty Housing Project for U.C., San Diego, California
 Solar Farms Project, Farming & Education, Apple Valley, California 
Thatcher Building, Glendale, California 
Ruth Ross Residence, Silverlake, Los Angeles, California 
Bernard H. Soffer Residence, Pacific Palisades, Los Angeles , California 
 Humane Society Animal Shelter and Office, Ventura, California
  Swedenborgian Church Conference Center, West Chester, Pennsylvania
 Visitor’s Center for The Wayfarer’s Chapel Palos Verdes, California - as consultant to Dean Andrews
 Tenemos Conference Center Dormitory for the Swedenborgian Church, West Chester, Pennsylvania - with Jay Cooperson
 Santaranta House, a private villa in Heinola, Finland

References

External links
 Eric Lloyd Wright, Chronology of Experience
 Eric Lloyd Wright, Personal History
 Mary Wright, artist
 Wright Way Organic Resource Center
 A fireproof House - Architect Eric Lloyd Wright July 25, 2007
 

1929 births
Architects from Los Angeles
Living people
UCLA Henry Samueli School of Engineering and Applied Science alumni
Frank Lloyd Wright